Azy is a commune in the Cher department in the Centre-Val de Loire region of France.

Geography

Population

Places of interest
 The church of St.Sulpice, dating from the thirteenth century.

See also
Communes of the Cher department

References

External links

Azy on the Quid website 

Communes of Cher (department)